Arlene Tur is an American actress, television presenter and model. She is best known for her roles as Bebe Arcel in the 2008 television drama series Crash, Armenia in the 2010 film Eat Pray Love and as Vera Juarez in Torchwood: Miracle Day.

Early life
Tur was born in Miami, Florida, the only child to parents who were Cuban political refugees to the United States. She graduated from Florida Christian School and attended Florida International University, where she graduated with dual Marketing and Public Relations degrees. Tur played professional beach volleyball during college, and as a result was approached by modeling agents and began a modeling career.

Career
Tur's first acting role was in the 2003 telemundo drama Los Teens. Arlene went on to study with Uta Hagen in New York City and Howard Fine in Los Angeles.

Subsequently, her roles included a 2006 guest-star appearance on Grey's Anatomy, a leading role in NBC's Haskett's Chance and the action film Final Engagement alongside Peter O'Toole .

Arlene garnered network attention for her comedic performance with Jason Segel and Mark Valley in the ABC/Paramount pilot "Harry Green and Eugene,", this led to a holding deal with ABC Network and Touchstone Television 

In 2008, Tur was cast as LAPD officer Bebe Arcel in Crash starring alongside Dennis Hopper.

In 2012, Tur had a recurring role in the BBC sci-fi drama Torchwood: Miracle Day as surgeon Vera Juarez.

Other work
Aside from acting, Tur has hosted shows for the Discovery Channel, E! Entertainment Television, the Travel Channel, and Univision.

In August 2011, Arlene appeared on Top Gear for the "Big Star, Small Car" segment.
Arlene finished with the time of 1:42.4 which was the fastest time among celebrities who have competed in the segment of the show. This was later topped by Patrick Warburton and Stephen Moyer.

Personal life
Tur lives in Los Angeles, California.

Filmography

References

External links

 

Living people
Year of birth missing (living people)
21st-century American actresses
American women's beach volleyball players
American entertainers of Cuban descent
Female models from California
American television actresses
Florida International University alumni
Hispanic and Latino American actresses
Actresses from Miami
Hispanic and Latino American female models
Actresses from Los Angeles
Female models from Florida